Cara Black and Liezel Huber were the defending champions, but Katarina Srebotnik and Ai Sugiyama defeated them  6–4, 7–5, in the final.

Seeds

Draw

Draw

External links
Draw

Generali Ladies Linz